UDP-D-xylose:beta-D-glucoside alpha-1,3-D-xylosyltransferase (beta-glucoside alpha-1,3-xylosyltransferase) is an enzyme with systematic name UDP-alpha-D-xylose:beta-D-glucoside 3-alpha-D-xylosyltransferase. This enzyme catalyses the following chemical reaction

 UDP-alpha-D-xylose + Glcbeta-Ser53-EGF-like domain of bovine factor IX(45-87)  UDP + Xylalpha(1-3)Glcbeta-Ser53-EGF-like domain of bovine factor IX(45-87)

The enzyme is involved in the biosynthesis of the Xylalpha(1-3)Xylalpha(1-3)Glcbeta-1-O-Ser on epidermal growth factor-like domains.

References

External links 
 

EC 2.4.2